Pemberton Music Festival was an annual four-day music festival that took place near Mount Currie in Pemberton, British Columbia.  Produced by Huka Entertainment, the 2016 event took place on  July 14–17.  The festival features multiple stages of live entertainment, including rock, indie rock, hip hop, electronic, heavy metal, and comedy.

On April 28, 2017, HUKA Entertainment announced the 2017 lineup.  It was to include Chance The Rapper, Muse, A Tribe Called Quest, Major Lazer, Run the Jewels, HAIM, Big Sean and others.

On May 18, 2017, it was announced the festival was cancelled and it had filed for bankruptcy.  Ernst & Young were appointed as the 'Trustee in Bankruptcy'.  Rising costs from the lower Canadian dollar and ticket sales were factors in the decision to file. Ticket holders and creditors were not expected to get a full refund or payment.  They will be creditors in the bankruptcy.

2014 lineup

Nine Inch Nails
Outkast
Deadmau5
Soundgarden
Frank Ocean
Kendrick Lamar
Metric
Modest Mouse
Snoop Dogg
Chance the Rapper
Above & Beyond
Empire of the Sun
Grimes
The Flaming Lips
Blondie
Cage the Elephant
Girl Talk
TV on the Radio
Young the Giant
Baauer
Randy Newman
Matthew Good
Schoolboy Q
St. Vincent
Tyler, The Creator
Violent Femmes
Earl Sweatshirt
Gord Downie, the Sadies
The New Pornographers
Sloan
Stars
Best Coast
Big Gigantic
Clockwork
Flying Lotus
Hayden
Matt Mays
RL Grime
Shlohmo
Delta Rae
Dinosaur Jr.
Fucked up
Griz
Hey Rosetta!
Kaytranada
Cashmere Cat
Purity Ring (Dj Set)
XXYYXX
Dan Deacon
Lettuce
Metz
Rich Aucoin
Wild Belle
ZZ Ward
Aer
The Boom Booms
Gold & Youth
Flash Lightnin’
The Tontons
Tory Lanez
Yukon Blonde
Hallelujah Train Feat. Daniel Lanois, Pastor Brady Blade, Brian Blade, Brady Blade Jr., Anders Osborne, Will Sexton, Chris Thomas, Malcolm Burn with Gospel Choir
Trailer Park Boys
Bob Saget
Lisa Lampanelli
Nick Swardson
Norm Macdonald
Doug Benson
Hannibal Buress
Tom Green
Brian Posehn
Jim Breuer
Natasha Leggero
Brian Scolaro
Kyle Dunnigan
Justice (band)

2015 lineup

Kendrick Lamar
The Black Keys
J. Cole
Tiësto
Hozier
Kid Cudi
Missy Elliott
Weezer
Jane's Addiction
The String Cheese Incident
Bassnectar
Passion Pit
Billy Talent
Chromeo
Dada Life
Sam Roberts Band
The Decemberists
The War on Drugs
Edward Sharpe & the Magnetic Zeros
Portugal. the Man
PARTYNEXTDOOR
Chvrches
Chet Faker
Beirut
RL Grime
Banks
De La Soul
STS9
Duke Dumont
Matt and Kim
Earl Sweatshirt
Flux Pavilion
Dan Mangan + Blacksmith
Father John Misty
Galactic featuring Macy Gray
Run the Jewels
Paul Oakenfold
Courtney Barnett
Cut Copy
Bleachers
Ryn Weaver
Logic
Tobias Jesso Jr.
Real Estate
Preservation Hall Jazz Band
Flatbush Zombies
Yung Lean
Givers
Moon Taxi
Ryan Hemsworth
July Talk
BADBADNOTGOOD
Charles Bradley & his Extraordinaires
Judah & the Lion
Gay Nineties
What So Not
Beats Antique
Kali Uchis
Spooky Black (Corbin)
The Suffers
Giraffage
DJ Dodger Stadium
Bas
Sango
JackLNDN
PPL MVR
Boyfriend (rapper)
Maggie Koerner
Full Flex Express featuring Jack U Skrillex + Diplo, Zeds Dead, A$AP Ferg, Tycho, Hundred Waters, & Anna Lunoe B2B MIJA
Tim & Eric
Reggie Watts
T. J. Miller
Doug Benson
Eric Andre
Harland Williams
Tig Notaro
Ali Wong
Ben Gleib
Gorburger
Chris Trew
Air Sex Championships
Later added: 
Broken Social Scene
Ludacris
Alice Cooper
G-Eazy
Shakey Graves
Zhu
Tune-Yards
The Glorious Sons
Post Malone
Apollo
Basecamp
Allie X
Hey Marseilles
JPNSGRLS
Letts
Pomo
Lovecoast
Dakota Pearl
Will Ross Band
Nick Offerman
Tim Heidecker
Neil Hamburger
Dino Archie
Ivan Decker

2016 lineup

Pearl Jam
The Killers
J. Cole
Snoop Dogg
Kaskade
Wiz Khalifa
Bassnectar
Ice Cube
Halsey
FKA Twigs
DJ Snake
Billy Idol
The Chainsmokers
Noel Gallagher's High Flying Birds
Steve Angello
Flosstradamus
Miguel
Purity Ring
Jesse Roper
Die Antwoord
Tyler, the Creator
Vince Staples
Cypress Hill
Hippie Sabotage*
Rich Aucoin
Mastodon
Arkells
Wolf Parade
Cold War Kids
Thievery Corporation
Girl Talk
Lance Herbstrong
YG
Baauer
Mickey Blue
Tory Lanez
Big Gigantic
Grace Potter
Børns
Method Man and Redman
Rae Sremmurd
Datsik
Coleman Hell
Kehlani
Ra Ra Riot
Wintersleep
Savages
Joey Bada$$
Keys n Krates
Robert Delong
SZA
Jon Bellion
Protoje
Anderson Paak & the Free Nationals
Lido
Hudson Mohawke
Givers
Kaleo
Diiv
White Denim
Allen Stone
Bully
Hucci
Mark Farina
Lunice
Bas
Trill Sammy X Dice Soho
Braids
The Glorious Sons
Hippie Sabotage
Shawn Hook
Miami Horror
Stick Figure
The Funk Hunters
The Zolas
The Elwins
The London Souls
Etsa
Chrome Sparks
Dizzy Wright
Jahkoy
Pell (musician)
The Internet
Jak Knight
Quaker City Night Hawks

2017 lineup
The 2017 festival was cancelled. This was the proposed lineup.

Chance The Rapper
Muse
A Tribe Called Quest
Major Lazer
HAIM
Run The Jewels
Marshmello
Diplo
Big Sean
Ween
Alesso
Logic
Tegan & Sara
MGMT
Future Islands
Zeds Dead
Migos
Carnage
Lil Uzi Vert
Nathaniel Rateliff & The Night Sweats
Slightly Stoopid
Ben Harper & The Innocent Criminals
GRiZ
Nelly
Rebelution
Lil Yachty
Deorro
A Tribe Called Red
Majid Jordan
Local Natives
Khalid
Eagles of Death Metal
The Avalanches
Bob Moses
July Talk
Joey Bada$$
6lack
Aminé
Thundercat
Cashmere Cat
Shovels & Rope
The Rural Alberta Advantage
Noname
Leithauser
Denzel Curry
Lecrae
Said The Whale
Pup
Giraffage
Pvris
Boyfriend
Dirty Radio
Tennyson
Marcus King Band
Kilo Kish
Tasha the Amazon
A. Chal
Hundred Waters

References

Rock festivals in Canada
Music festivals in British Columbia
Pop music festivals in Canada